Fodé Sissoko (born 9 October 1996) is a Malian sprinter competing primarily in the 200 metres. He competed in the 200 metres at the 2020 Summer Olympics. He also competed in the same event at the 2019 World Athletics Championships.

He currently resides in Lille, France. In an interview, he explained his reasoning behind the move. He said the political conditions in Mali weren't conducive to him reaching the top level, thus moving to France would allow him to reach a new level. However, he continues to compete on behalf of Mali while living outside his homeland.

Personal bests
Outdoor
100 metres – 10.48 (Montgeron 2020)
200 metres – 20.52 (Kortrijk 2018) NR
400 metres – 46.28 (Brussels 2018)
Indoor
60 metres – 6.80 (Liévin 2019)
200 metres – 20.88 (Miramas 2021) NR
300 metres – 33.15 (Ghent 2019)
400 metres – 47.58 (Liévin 2019) NR

References

1996 births
Living people
Malian male sprinters
Athletes (track and field) at the 2020 Summer Olympics
Olympic athletes of Mali
World Athletics Championships athletes for Mali
21st-century Malian people